Caroline Curren (born 31 October 1962) is an Australian judoka. She competed in the women's heavyweight event at the 2000 Summer Olympics.

References

External links
 

1962 births
Living people
Australian female judoka
Olympic judoka of Australia
Judoka at the 2000 Summer Olympics
Sportspeople from Melbourne